These are lists of animated television series first aired in the 2010s, organized by year:

List of animated television series of 2010
List of animated television series of 2011
List of animated television series of 2012
List of animated television series of 2013
List of animated television series of 2014
List of animated television series of 2015
List of animated television series of 2016
List of animated television series of 2017
List of animated television series of 2018
List of animated television series of 2019

2010s
2010s animated television series
Animatds series